Rumble Fish (럼블피쉬) was a South Korean rock band. The group disbanded in 2010 after a majority of members left.

Former members 
 Kim Sung-gun (김성근, guitar)
 Kim Ho-il (김호일, bass)
 Park Chun-hwee (박천휘, drums)
 Choi Jin-yi (최진이, vocals, guitar)

Discography

Albums 
 Swing Attack, July 2004
 Have A Nice Dream, July 2005
 I Go (Digital Single), July 2006
 Open The Safe, March 2007
Fly
봄이 되어 꽃은 피고
Smile Again
사랑한다
그 여자의 하루
In The End
Two-Time
日常茶飯事 (일상다반사)
이별...마시다
거짓말
월화수목금토일
Good-Bye
봄이 되어 꽃은 피고 (Full Version)

 Open The Safe (Special Edition), July 2007
 Memory For You, November 2008
 One sweet day, October 2009
Intro
너 정말이니
Let Me Love
Don't Stop
엘리나
Lost In Paradise
Sorry
One Sweet Day
앙코르 (Encore) (Unplugged Ver.)
1994년 어느 늦은 밤
내 사랑 내 곁에
앙코르 (Encore)
한 사람을 위한 마음

Awards

Mnet Asian Music Awards

References

External links 
 Rumble Fish in empas people
 Rock band Rumble Fish goes… solo? from allkpop
 South Korea Rock band Rumble Fish in askactor
 Cover Art

South Korean indie rock groups
South Korean co-ed groups
Musical groups established in 2004